Conventional sex, colloquially known as vanilla sex, is sexual behavior that is within the range of normality for a culture or subculture, and typically involves sex which does not include elements of BDSM, kink, or fetishism.

Description
What is regarded as conventional sex depends on cultural and subcultural norms. Among heterosexual couples in the Western world, for example, conventional sex often refers to sexual intercourse in the missionary position. It can also describe penetrative sex which does not have any element of BDSM, kink or fetish.

The British Medical Journal regards conventional sex between homosexual couples as "sex that does not extend beyond affection, mutual masturbation, and oral and anal sex." In addition to mutual masturbation, penetrative sexual activity among same-sex pairings is contrasted by non-insertive acts such as intercrural sex, frot and tribadism, although tribadism has been cited as a common but rarely discussed sexual practice among lesbians.

Vanilla sexuality
The term "vanilla" in "vanilla sex" derives from the use of vanilla extract as the basic flavoring for ice cream, and by extension, meaning plain or conventional. In relationships where only one partner enjoys less conventional forms of sexual expression, the partner who does not enjoy such activities as much as the other is often referred to as the vanilla partner. As such, it is easy for them to be erroneously branded unadventurous in sexual matters. Through exploration with their partner, it may be possible for a more vanilla-minded person to discover new facets of their sexuality. As with any sexually active person, they may find their preferences on the commonly termed "vanilla-kink spectrum" are sufficient for their full satisfaction.

References

LGBT terminology
Sexual acts